Werner August Josef Betz (1 September 1912 – 13 July 1980) was a German philologist who was Chair of German and Nordic Philology at Ludwig Maximilian University of Munich.

Biography
Werner Betz was born in Frankfurt, Germany on 1 September 1912. He gained a PhD in 1936 with a dissertation on Latin influence on Germanic. From 1937 to 1940, with a grant from the Deutsche Forschungsgemeinschaft, Betz was a research assistant of Theodor Frings. He served in the Kriegsmarine during World War II. After the war, Betz became Chair of German and Nordic Philology at Ludwig Maximilian University of Munich. He died in Munich on 13 July 1980.

Betz was considered an expert on Germanic Antiquity. His writings on Germanic mythology were influenced by the theories of Georges Dumézil.

Selected works
 Der Einfluss des Lateinischen auf den althochdeutschen Sprachschatz. 1: Der Abrogans, 1936
 Deutsch und Lateinisch: die Lehnbildungen der althochdeutschen Benediktinerregel, 1949
 (Publisher and Contributor) Taylor Starck: Festschrift ; [... presented to Professor emeritus Taylor Starck by his friends, colleagues, and pupils on the occasion of his seventy-fifth birthday october fifteenth, nineteen hundred and sixty-four], 1964

See also
 Otto Höfler
 Jost Trier
 Wolfgang Krause

References

Sources

 Christina Bürger: Betz, Werner. In: Christoph König (ed.): Internationales Germanistenlexikon 1800–1950. Vol. 1: A–G. De Gruyter, Berlin/New York 2003 [Reprint 2011], pp. 169–170

External links
 
 Werner Betz in the OPAC of Regesta Imperii

1912 births
1980 deaths
Kriegsmarine personnel
Academic staff of the Ludwig Maximilian University of Munich
Writers from Frankfurt
German philologists
Germanists
Germanic studies scholars
Old Norse studies scholars
Scandinavian studies scholars
20th-century philologists